Aurora is the debut extended play (EP) by Dutch DJ duo Vicetone. It was released via Spinnin' Records.

Background 
Speaking about the EP, Vicetone described it as a project where they "stay true" to their original style while "taking it in new directions". "Siren", a song from the EP features American Idol participant Pia Toscano.

Track listing

Charts

References

2016 EPs
Dance music EPs